Caucas or Kavkasos was the supposed ancestor of Chechens and Ingush according to The Georgian Chronicles. His story is narrated in the compilation of the medieval Georgian chronicles, Kartlis Tskhovreba, taken down from oral tradition by Leonti Mroveli in the 11th century. The legend has it that he was a son of Targamos and, thus, brother of Hayk (known to be ancestor of Armenian people), Movakos, Lekos (referred to as the ancestor of Lezgic peoples), Heros, Kartlos (known to be ancestor of Georgian people), and Egros.

Caucas' son Durdzuk is said to be the ancestor of the Chechens and Ingush.

Genealogy

Descendants
 Ingush's and Chechens (Vainakhs)

References

Georgian mythology
Japheth
Legendary progenitors